The Yugoslavia men's national under-16 basketball team was the boys' basketball team, administered by Basketball Federation of Yugoslavia, that represented SFR Yugoslavia in international under-16 (under age 16) men's basketball competitions, consisted mainly of the European Championship for Cadets, nowadays known as the FIBA Europe Under-16 Championship.

After the dissolution of SFR Yugoslavia in 1991, the successor countries all set up their own national under-16 teams. Bosnia and Herzegovina, Serbia and Croatia teams won the Championship, as of 2022.

Several members of the team have been inducted into the FIBA Hall of Fame, including players Mirza Delibašić, Vlade Divac, Jure Zdovc, Dragan Kićanović, Toni Kukoč, Dražen Petrović, and coaches Mirko Novosel and Svetislav Pešić. Also, Divac, Petrović, Kukoč, and Novosel are members of the Naismith Memorial Basketball Hall of Fame.

Individual awards 
Top Scorer
 Dražen Petrović — 1981
 Arijan Komazec – 1987

Competitive record

Coaches

Rosters

New national teams 
After the dissolution of SFR Yugoslavia in 1991, five new countries were created: Bosnia and Herzegovina, Croatia, FYR Macedonia, FR Yugoslavia (in 2003, renamed to Serbia and Montenegro) and Slovenia. In 2006, Montenegro became an independent nation and Serbia became the legal successor of Serbia and Montenegro. In 2008, Kosovo declared independence from Serbia and became a FIBA member in 2015.

Here is a list of men's national under-16 teams on the SFR Yugoslavia area:
  (1992–present)
  (1992–present)
  (1993–present)
  (1992–2006)
  (2006–present)
  (2006–present)
  (2015–present)
  (1992–present)

See also 
 Yugoslavia men's national under-19 basketball team
 Yugoslavia men's national under-18 basketball team

References

M U16
Men's national under-16 basketball teams